Mark Eugene Amodei (born June 12, 1958) is an American lawyer and politician serving as the U.S. representative for Nevada's 2nd congressional district since 2011. The only Republican in Nevada's congressional delegation since 2019, Amodei served in the Nevada Assembly from 1997 to 1999 and in the Nevada Senate, representing the Capital District, from 1999 to 2011.

Amodei chaired the Nevada Republican Party from 2010 until 2011, when he stepped down to run in the September 13, 2011, special election to succeed Dean Heller (who had been appointed to the U.S. Senate) as the U.S. representative for the state's 2nd congressional district. In 2019, Amodei became the dean of Nevada's congressional delegation and its sole Republican member after Heller lost his bid for reelection to the Senate.

Early life, education and military service
Amodei was born in Carson City, Nevada, the son of Joy LaRhe (née Longero) and Donald Mark Amodei. His father was of half Italian and half Irish descent, and one of his maternal great-grandfathers was Italian. Amodei graduated from Carson High School in 1976, where he was student class president. He graduated from the University of Nevada in 1980 with a B.A. in political science, and received his J.D. degree from the University of the Pacific McGeorge School of Law in 1983.

When Amodei entered the U.S. Army, he had not yet passed the bar exam, so he was assigned to an artillery unit. He attended The JAG School at the University of Virginia and entered U.S. Army JAG Corps after passing the bar. He became an Army JAG Corps officer prosecuting criminal matters, an Assistant U.S. Attorney and Assistant Post Judge Advocate. He was awarded the Army Achievement Medal, the Army Commendation Medal and the Meritorious Service Medal. He served with the United States Army Judge Advocate General Corps from 1983 to 1987. He returned home to become an attorney with the law firms Allison MacKenzie in Carson City and Kummer Kaempfer Bonner Renshaw and Ferrario (now Kaempfer Crowell) in Reno. He served as a lawyer with Allison, MacKenzie from 1987 to 2004 and with Kummer from 2004 to 2007.

As a lawyer, Amodei has been a sole practitioner since 2009. He served as president of the Nevada Mining Association from 2007 to 2008.

Nevada legislature

Elections
In 1996, Amodei was elected to the Nevada Assembly, representing Carson City. In 1998, he ran for the Nevada Senate in the Capital District. He defeated incumbent Democratic State Senator Ernie Adler, 52%–48%. In 2002, he was reelected to a second term with 84% of the vote. In 2006, he was reelected to a third term with 78% of the vote.

Tenure
Amodei was named the Outstanding Freshman Legislator in 1997. He was selected to serve as president pro tempore of the Nevada Senate from 2003 to 2008.

2003 tax increase

In 2003 Amodei and Terry Care co-authored a plan to increase taxes in Nevada by $1 billion. The plan was offered as an alternative to Governor Kenny Guinn's plan, which called for over $1 billion in revenue increases. The final plan raised taxes by $873 million.

Collective bargaining
In 2009, Amodei supported a proposal to expand collective bargaining rights for state workers, who he believed were unfairly treated during the budget process.

Gas tax
In 2009, Amodei sponsored a bill that would have allowed for a gas tax increase in Washoe County; the plan gained public approval in an advisory vote.

Medical liability reform
In 2003, Amodei voted against a tort reform bill that would have changed Nevada's medical liability law. He was the only Republican senator to vote against the bill.

Committee assignments
Amodei has served on the Legislative Commission, the Education Commission of the States, the Public Lands Committee, the Tahoe Regional Planning Agency Legislative Oversight Committee, as vice chair of the Governor's Task Force on Access to Public Health Care, as chair of the Education Technology Committee, and as a member of the Nevada Supreme Court's committee on court funding.

2010 U.S. Senate election

Amodei ran for the Republican nomination for U.S. Senate against Democrat Harry Reid, the Majority Leader. He dropped out before election day, as State Assemblywoman Sharron Angle won the primary and lost the general election to Reid.

U.S. House of Representatives

Elections

2011

On September 13, 2011, Nevada's 2nd congressional district elected Amodei to replace U.S. Representative Dean Heller. Heller had been appointed to fill John Ensign's seat in the U.S. Senate after Ensign resigned from the position. Amodei announced his bid for the congressional seat in May 2011. The next month, he won the Republican nomination by taking 221 out of 323 ballots. In the primary, he defeated State Senator Greg Brower, who received 56 votes, and U.S. Navy veteran Kirk Lippold, who received 46 votes.

Amodei defeated Democratic nominee Kate Marshall 58%–36%. He won every county in the district.

2012

Amodei ran for a full term against Democrat Samuel Koepnick, an information technology employee for the State of Nevada. He was endorsed by the National Rifle Association (NRA). He did so in a district that had been made slightly more compact than its predecessor in redistricting. It lost almost all of its southern portion to the new 4th district. Even so, it was still the eighth-largest district in the country that did not cover an entire state.

Amodei defeated Koepnick 58%–36%. He won every county in the district.

2014

Amodei ran for reelection to his second full term. He defeated Democrat Kristen Spees, 65.8% to 27.9%.

2016

Amodei ran for reelection to a third full term. He defeated Democrat Chip Evans, 58.3% to 36.9%.

2018

Amodei ran for reelection to a fourth full term. He defeated Democrat Clint Koble, 58.2% to 41.8%.

2020

Amodei ran for reelection to a fifth full term. He defeated Democrat Patricia Ackerman, 56.5% to 40.7%.

Tenure
Amodei was sworn in on September 15, 2011.

Amodei voted against the bill to end the United States federal government shutdown of 2013. Of the vote, he said, "During two campaigns, I told Nevadans I would give my full attention to such issues as reining in runaway federal spending, debt, and the harmful aspects of the Affordable Care Act. Unlike many in this town, I will not test your memories and hope you have forgotten. I will continue to pursue these necessary goals. Nothing in this legislation changes the real threats to our country's economy."

Amodei received a 0% rating from Planned Parenthood's 2014 Congressional Scorecard for supporting a nationwide abortion ban after 20 weeks and banning abortion access in the District of Columbia and through the Patient Protection and Affordable Care Act.

Amodei announced his support for a House impeachment inquiry into Donald Trump on September 27, 2019. National news media began to refer to Amodei as the first House Republican to support impeachment. A spokesman then further clarified his position by stating Amodei supported an inquiry but not impeachment.

Immigration
Amodei voted for the Further Consolidated Appropriations Act of 2020, which authorized DHS to nearly double the available H-2B visas for the remainder of FY 2020.

Amodei voted for the Consolidated Appropriations Act (H.R. 1158), which effectively prohibits ICE from cooperating with Health and Human Services to detain or remove illegal alien sponsors of unaccompanied alien children (UACs).

Amodei supports Deferred Action for Childhood Arrivals (DACA).

LGBT rights
In 2021, Amodei was among the House Republicans to sponsor the Fairness for All Act, the Republican alternative to the Equality Act. The bill's stated goal is to prohibit discrimination on the basis of sex, sexual orientation, and gender identity, and protect the free exercise of religion.

Legislation
On July 25, 2014, Amodei introduced the Northern Nevada Land Conservation and Economic Development Act (H.R. 5205; 113th Congress), a bill that would require the Bureau of Land Management (BLM) to convey certain federal lands in Nevada to other government entities. The bill is a package of numerous other bills related to land conveyance in Nevada, which make up the bulk of Amodei's legislation.

In total, Amodei has sponsored 45 bills, including:

112th Congress (2011–2012)
 H.R.3292: a bill to prohibit the further extension or establishment of national monuments in Nevada except by express authorization of Congress
 H.R.3377: Pine Forest Range Recreation Enhancement Act of 2011, a bill to designate specified federal land managed by the Bureau of Land Management (BLM) in Humboldt County, Nevada, and to be known as the Pine Forest Range Wilderness, as wilderness and as a component of the National Wilderness Preservation System (NWPS).
 H.R.3815: Elko Motocross and Tribal Conveyance Act, a bill to direct the Secretary of the Interior to convey to Elko County, Nevada, without consideration, all right, title, and interest of the United States in and to approximately 275 acres of land managed by the Bureau of Land Management (BLM), Elko District, Nevada, as depicted on the map as "Elko Motocross Park."
 H.R.3996: Southern Nevada Higher Education Land Act of 2012, a bill to direct the Secretary of the Interior to convey three parcels of Bureau of Land Management (BLM) land to: (1) the Nevada System of Higher Education for the Great Basin College and the College of Southern Nevada; and (2) the System for the University of Nevada, Las Vegas.
 H.R.4039: Yerington Land Conveyance and Sustainable Development Act, a bill to direct the Secretary of the Interior to convey to the city of Yerington, Nevada, all interest of the United States in the federal lands in Lyon and Mineral Counties, Nevada, identified as "City of Yerington Sustainable Development Conveyance Lands" in exchange for consideration in an amount equal to their fair market value.
 H.R.4402: National Strategic and Critical Minerals Production Act of 2012, a bill to streamline the permitting process for mineral development by coordinating the actions of federal agencies.
 H.R.4976: Small Lands Tracts Conveyance Act, a bill to accelerate the process for transferring small parcels of federal land to local communities.
 H.R.6184: Restoring Storey County Act, a bill to direct the Secretary of the Interior, through the Bureau of Land Management (BLM), to convey to Storey County, Nevada, all surface rights of the United States in and to specified federal land, including any improvements.
 H.R.6236: a bill to direct the Secretary of the Interior, acting through the Bureau of Land Management and the Bureau of Reclamation, to convey, by quitclaim deed, to the City of Fernley, Nevada, all right, title, and interest of the United States, to any Federal land within that city that is under the jurisdiction of either of those agencies.
 H.R.6282: a bill to direct the Secretary of the Interior, acting through the Bureau of Land Management, to convey to the City of Carlin, Nevada, in exchange for consideration, all right, title, and interest of the United States, to any federal land within that city that is under the jurisdiction of that agency, and for other purposes.
 H.R.6453: a bill to facilitate planning, permitting, administration, implementation, and monitoring of pinyon-juniper dominated landscape restoration projects within Lincoln County, Nevada, and for other purposes.
 H.R.6496: a bill to reauthorize grants to enhance state and local efforts to combat trafficking in persons.
 H.R.6497: Nevada Mining Townsite Conveyance Act of 2012, a bill to direct the Secretary of the Interior, acting through the Bureau of Land Management (BLM), to convey, to the counties in which they are situated, all interest of the United States in certain mining townsites in Esmeralda and Nye Counties, Nevada.
 H.R.6596: Naval Air Station Fallon Housing and Safety Development Act, a bill to direct the Secretary of the Interior to transfer to the Secretary of the Navy, without consideration, approximately 400 acres of federal land adjacent to Naval Air Station Fallon in Churchill County, Nevada, that was withdrawn under a specified public land order.
 H.AMDT.1303 to H.R.4480, an amendment to prohibit the Secretary of the Interior from moving any aspect of the Solid Minerals program administered by the Bureau of Land Management (BLM) to the Office of Surface Mining, Reclamation and Enforcement (OSM).

113th Congress (2013–2014)
 H.R.433: Pine Forest Range Recreation Enhancement Act of 2013, a bill to designate specified federal land managed by the Bureau of Land Management (BLM) in Humboldt County, Nevada, and to be known as the Pine Forest Range Wilderness, as wilderness and as a component of the National Wilderness Preservation System.
 H.R.761: National Strategic and Critical Minerals Production Act of 2013, a bill to streamline the permitting process for mineral development by coordinating the actions of federal agencies.
 H.R.1167: Restoring Storey County Act, a bill to direct the Secretary of the Interior, through the Bureau of Land Management (BLM), to convey to Storey County, Nevada, all surface rights of the United States in specified federal land, including any improvements.
 H.R.1168: a bill to direct the Secretary of the Interior, acting through the Bureau of Land Management, to convey to the City of Carlin, Nevada, in exchange for consideration, all right, title, and interest of the United States, to any Federal land within that city that is under the jurisdiction of that agency, and for other purposes.
 H.R.1169: Naval Air Station Fallon Housing and Safety Development Act, a bill to direct the Secretary of the Interior to transfer to the Secretary of the Navy, without consideration, approximately 400 acres of federal land adjacent to Naval Air Station Fallon in Churchill County, Nevada, that was withdrawn under a specified public land order.
 H.R.1170: a  bill to direct the Secretary of the Interior, acting through the Bureau of Land Management and the Bureau of Reclamation, to convey, by quitclaim deed, to the City of Fernley, Nevada, all right, title, and interest of the United States, to any federal land within that city that is under the jurisdiction of either of those agencies.
 H.R.1633: Small Lands Tracts Conveyance Act, a bill to require the Director of the Bureau of Land Management (BLM) for a state (respecting certain public lands) or the Regional Forester (respecting certain National Forest System lands) to select an eligible federal lands parcel for conveyance: (1) in response to a request by an adjacent landholder (any holder of non-federal land that shares one or more boundaries with such a parcel and who requests to purchase such a parcel), or (2) upon the recommendation of the BLM District Office or System unit that exercises administration over such parcel.
 H.R.1880: Protecting Resort Cities from Discrimination Act of 2013, a bill to prohibit a federal agency from establishing or implementing an internal policy that discourages or prohibits the selection of a travel, event, meeting, or conference location because it is perceived to be a resort or vacation destination.
 H.R.2455: Nevada Native Nations Land Act, a bill which includes seven tribal lands measures, as well as a smaller purchase by the City of Elko.
 H.R.3390: Lake Tahoe Restoration Act of 2013, a bill to reduce the threat of wildfire, improve water clarity, combat invasive species, and restore the environment in the Lake Tahoe Basin.
 H.R.3716: Pyramid Lake Paiute Tribe – Fish Springs Ranch Settlement Act, a bill to authorize and ratify the Pyramid Lake Paiute Tribe-Fish Springs Ranch 2013 Supplement to the 2007 Settlement Agreement, dated November 20, 2013, and entered into by the Pyramid Lake Paiute Tribe and the Fish Springs Ranch (Agreement).
 H.R.5205: Northern Nevada Land Conservation and Economic Development Act, a bill to designate approximately 26,000 acres of land managed by the Bureau of Land Management (BLM) in Humboldt County, Nevada, as the Pine Forest Range Wilderness.
 H.AMDT.82 to H.R.2216 an amendment to provide that the $44 million in funding within the General Operating Expenses account of the Veterans Benefits Administration should be used for increased staffing in certain regional Veterans Affairs offices.

114th Congress (2015–2016)
 H.R.1937: National Strategic and Critical Minerals Production Act of 2015, a bill to streamline the permitting process for mineral development by coordinating the actions of federal agencies.
 H.R.488: a bill to prohibit the further extension or establishment of national monuments in Nevada except by express authorization of Congress.
 H.R.925: Douglas County Conservation Act of 2015, a bill to expand recreational opportunities, promotes conservation, and jump-starts economic development in Douglas County, Nevada.
 H.R.1214: National Forest Small Tracts Act Amendments Act of 2015, a bill to amend the Small Tracts Act (the Act) to permit the sale, exchange, or interchange under such Act of National Forest System (NFS) lands the sale or exchange of which is not practicable under any other authority of the Department of Agriculture (USDA) which have a value determined to be not more than $500,000.
 H.R.1484: Honor the Nevada Enabling Act of 1864 Act, a bill to direct the Department of Agriculture (USDA) and the Department of the Interior to convey, in phases and without consideration, to the state of Nevada all interest of the United States in federal lands owned, managed, or controlled by the federal government through the USDA or Interior for the purpose of permitting the state to use them to support select beneficiaries.
 H.R.1485: Federal Lands Invasive Species Control, Prevention, and Management Act, a bill to direct the Department of the Interior and the Department of Agriculture to plan and carry out activities on lands directly managed by the department concerned to control and manage invasive species in order to inhibit or reduce their populations and to effectuate restoration or reclamation efforts.
 H.R.2324: Small Lands Tracts Conveyance Act, a bill to accelerate the process for transferring small parcels of federal land to local communities.
 H.R.2733: Nevada Native Nations Land Act, a bill to hold lands for six Nevada Tribes in trust.
 H.R.926: To amend title 38, United States Code, to improve the provision of guide dogs to veterans blinded by a service-connected injury.
 H.R.4298: Vietnam Helicopter Crew Memorial Act, a bill directing the Department of the Army to place in Arlington National Cemetery a memorial honoring helicopter pilots and crew members who served on active duty in the Armed Forces during the Vietnam era.
 H.R.4688: Douglas County Economic Development and Conservation Act of 2016, a bill to direct the Forest Service to convey approximately 67 acres of certain Forest Service land (Lake Tahoe-Nevada State Park) to the state of Nevada for the conservation of wildlife or natural resources or for a public park.
 H.RES.501: Expressing the sense of the House that the United States postal facility network is an asset of significant value and the United States Postal Service should take appropriate measures to maintain, modernize and fully utilize the existing post office network for economic growth.

Committee assignments

114th Congress:

House Committee on Appropriations
 Subcommittee on Interior, Environment and Related Agencies
 Subcommittee on Financial Services and General Government
 Subcommittee on the Legislative Branch

In the 112th and 113th Congress, Amodei served on the House Judiciary Committee, the House Committee on Natural Resources and the House Committee on Veterans Affairs:

House Judiciary Committee
 Subcommittee on Courts, Intellectual Property, and the Internet
 Subcommittee on Immigration and Border Security

House Natural Resources Committee
 Subcommittee on National Parks, Forests, and Public Lands
 Subcommittee on Energy and Mineral Resources

House Committee on Veterans Affairs
 Subcommittee on Economic Opportunity
 Disability Assistance and Memorial Affairs

Caucus memberships
 Congressional Western Caucus
 Climate Solutions Caucus
 U.S.-Japan Caucus
Republican Governance Group
Problem Solvers Caucus (former)

2020 presidential election 
Amodei did not join the majority of Republican members of Congress who sided with the Trump's attempts to overturn the 2020 United States presidential election. He voted to certify both Arizona's and Pennsylvania's results in the 2021 United States Electoral College vote count.

Electoral history

Personal life
Amodei has two daughters: Erin, a nursing student at Truckee Meadows Community College, and Ryanne, a physician trainer on the DaVinci Robotic Surgical Instrument and former engineer in the U.S. Navy.

References

External links
 Congressman Mark Amodei official U.S. House website
 Amodei for Congress
 
 
 

|-

|-

|-

1958 births
20th-century American politicians
21st-century American politicians
American people of Irish descent
Living people
McGeorge School of Law alumni
Republican Party members of the Nevada Assembly
Military personnel from Nevada
Nevada lawyers
Republican Party Nevada state senators
Politicians from Carson City, Nevada
Republican Party members of the United States House of Representatives
State political party chairs of Nevada
The Judge Advocate General's Legal Center and School alumni
United States Army officers
University of Nevada alumni
American people of Italian descent